The Gornalunga is an  river located in central-eastern Sicily.

The river springs from Monte Rossomanno, on the Erean Mountains, in the province of Enna. After flowing through the plain of Catania, the river becomes an affluent of the Simeto river just few miles before reaching the Mediterranean coast.

Along its course, the Gornalunga forms the artificial lake, Lago di Ogliastro, and touches three provinces, Enna, Catania and Syracuse.

Notes

Rivers of Italy
Rivers of Sicily
Rivers of the Province of Enna
Rivers of the Province of Catania
Rivers of the Province of Syracuse